Heinerfest is an annual festival in Darmstadt, Germany, held annually in the first weekend of July. During the festival food and beer vendors along with amusement rides and games surround the old city center and occupy surrounding streets. It offers a wide range of child friendly ride or adult rides. The first Heinerfest occurred in 1951 and has been growing since every year.

The festival allows fun for small children, youths and adults. There are food, beverages, and many amusement rides such as roller coasters or ferris wheels.

Rides
The Heinerfest in 2017 presents a variety of rides including:
 An 85-meter free fall tower
 A carousel, big and small
 Apollo 13, a ride based on the legendary Apollo 13

Children 
The Heinerfest is a very child-friendly event. It offers fun and inexpensive rides for toddlers and youths.

References 

Festivals in Germany